Victor Glover may refer to:

 Horace Glover (1883–1967), also known by middle name Victor, English footballer
 Victor J. Glover (born 1976), NASA astronaut
 Sir Victor Glover (judge) (1932–2020), Chief Judge, Mauritius